Aaron Belz (born September 27, 1971) is an American writer and poet.

Early life and education
Belz grew up in Kirkwood, Missouri and attended schools including Westminster Christian Academy, the Stony Brook School and Framlingham College. He was awarded a Maclellan Foundation Scholarship to attend Covenant College in Georgia in 1990, and graduated with a double major in English and History in 1993. Belz was enrolled in the Creative Writing program at New York University's Graduate School of Arts and Sciences. In 2007, he received a Ph.D. in English at Saint Louis University.

Career

In 2003 Belz founded Observable Readings, a poetry series and imprint in St. Louis.

Belz published his first book of poetry, The Bird Hoverer, in 2007. He then began teaching English and Creative Writing at Fontbonne University, and later at Saint Louis University, Southern Illinois University Edwardsville, and Providence Christian College.

He published a second book, Lovely, Raspberry: Poems, in 2010. In 2013, he was in the news after many media outlets picked up a story about a Craigslist ad he placed to sell custom poems.

Belz's poetry often contains elements of humor; in 2013 he performed readings at The Comedy Club and a writers' conference.

In 2013, Belz opened up Hillsborough Bicycle, a bicycle repair shop, with his son Eli in Hillsborough, North Carolina.

In 2014 Belz was teaching English at Durham Technical Community College in Durham, North Carolina. That year he published his third book, Glitter Bomb: Poems.

Belz's poetry has appeared in Fence, Exquisite Corpse, The Atlantic and The Washington Post, and his essays and reviews have appeared in The Wall Street Journal, the San Francisco Chronicle and the St. Louis Post-Dispatch.

Bibliography 

 The Bird Hoverer, BlazeVOX Books, 2007. 
 Lovely, Raspberry: Poems, Persea, 2010. 
 Glitter Bomb: Poems, Persea, 2014. 
 Soft Launch: Poems, Persea, 2019.

References

External links 

 Official website
 Poems
 YouTube channel
 "Coming Close: Forty Essays on Philip Levine". University of Iowa Press

1971 births
Living people
American male poets
Writers from St. Louis
The Stony Brook School alumni
Covenant College alumni
Saint Louis University alumni
21st-century American poets
21st-century American male writers
Poets from Missouri